The Police of Serbia, formally the Police of the Republic of Serbia, commonly abbreviated to Serbian Police, is the national civilian police force of the Republic of Serbia. The Serbian Police is responsible for all local and national law enforcement. It is under the jurisdiction of the Ministry of Internal Affairs. The General Police Directorate of the Ministry of Internal Affairs has 15 organizational units and 27 Regional Police Directorates.

Organization
The Ministry's General Police Directorate operates five separate departments, the: 
Department for Organization, Prevention and Community Policing,
Department for Public Peace and Order and Other Police Affairs,
Department for Special Actions, Intervention Police Formation, Defense Preparations and Reserve Preparation,
Department for Control of Legitimacy of Work, and 
Department for Staffing, Improvement and Police Equipping.

There are 161 local police stations across the country, 62 border patrol stations and 49 traffic police stations. As of August 2016, the Serbian Police has a total of 28,266 of uniformed officers, while a total of 42,817 are employees of the Ministry of Internal Affairs. Of those, 70.2% have secondary education, while 27.8% have higher or high education.

Special units
 Gendarmery
 Special Anti-Terrorist Unit (SAJ)
 Helicopter unit

Education and training
The law enforcement education in Serbia is the provider for the Basic Police Training Centre and the Criminal and Police Academy's.

Within the Training Centre there are local educational centres in: Makiš, Belgrade, Kula, Klisa, Petrovo Selo, Jasenovo, Mitrovo Polje and Kuršumlijska Banja.

Vehicles

Motor vehicles

This is a list of vehicles used by Serbian Police:
 BMW F10
 Dacia Duster
 Fiat Ducato
 Fiat 500L
 Fiat Grande Punto
 Fiat Tipo (2015)
 Hyundai i20
 Iveco Stralis
 Jeep Renegade
 Mercedes-Benz Sprinter
 Mitsubishi Outlander
 Mitsubishi ASX
 Peugeot 208
 Peugeot 308
 Peugeot Boxer
 Toyota Land Cruiser
 Volkswagen Golf Mk7
 Škoda Fabia
 Škoda Karoq
 Škoda Rapid
 Škoda Octavia Mk3 Facelift
 Škoda Scala
 Škoda Superb
 Škoda Yeti
 Zastava Skala

Armored Vehicles
 BOV (APC) - 19+ 
 BOV M11 - 12
 BOV-3 - 2+
 BOV M16 Milos - 2+
 Lazar 3 - 12
 Land Rover Defender Armored
 TAM 110 T7 B/BVRis

Rotorcraft
 Airbus Helicopters H145M - 4 
 Airbus Helicopters H215 - 3 
 Aérospatiale Gazelle - 4
 Bell 206 - 4
 Sikorsky S-76 - 1

Gallery

See also
 Crime in Serbia
 Municipal police (Serbia)
 Ministry of Internal Affairs (Serbia)

References

External links

Police Directorate
Ministry of Internal Affairs
Organigram of the Ministry of Interior
OSCE Study on policing in the Federal Republic of Yugoslavia - by Richard Monk (2001)
OSCE Report Police Reform in Serbia: Towards the Creation of a Modern and Accountable Police Service - by Mark Downes (2004)
OSCE Report Policing the Economic Transition in Serbia: An assessment of the Serbian Police Service's capacities to fight economic crime - by Reto Brunhart and Novak Gajić (2005)
Police Reform in Serbia: Five Years Later - by Branka Bakic and Novak Gajic (2006)

Law enforcement in Serbia
National Central Bureaus of Interpol